Midler v. Ford Motor Co., 849 F.2d 460 (9th Cir. 1988) is a United States Court of Appeals case in which Bette Midler sought remedy against Ford Motor Company for a series of commercials in the 1980s which used a Midler impersonator.  The case brought into question if a unique feature, such as a voice, can distinguish someone and thus must be authorized for impersonation.

Background
Ford Motor created an ad campaign for the Mercury Sable that specifically was meant to inspire nostalgic sentiments through the use of famous songs from the 1970s sung by their original artists.  When the original artists refused to accept, impersonators were used to sing the original songs for the commercials.  Midler was asked to sing a famous song of hers for the commercial and refused.  Subsequently, the company hired a voice-impersonator of Midler and carried on with using the song for the commercial, since it had been approved by the copyright-holder.  Midler's image and likeness were not used in the commercial but many claimed the voice used sounded impeccably like Midler's.

Midler brought the case to a district court where she claimed that her voice was protected from appropriation and thus sought compensation.  The district court claimed there was no legal principle preventing the use of her voice and granted summary judgment to Ford Motor.  Midler appealed to the Appellate court, 9th Circuit.

Case
Midler pursued a common law judgment against Ford for using her distinctive voice without her authorization.  The appellate court pondered the question of whether or not an artist's voice is a distinctive personal feature over which a person has controlling rights from appropriation.  Midler was not seeking damages for copyright infringement of the song itself, but rather for the use of her voice which she claimed was distinctive of her person as a singer.  The recognition of Midler's voice in the commercial was found to be the intentional motivation and a major feature of the commercial.

Decision
The appellate court ruled that the voice of someone famous as a singer is distinctive to their person and image and therefore, as a part of their identity, it is unlawful to imitate their voice without express consent and approval.  The appellate court reversed the district courts decision and ruled in favor of Midler, indicating her voice was protected against unauthorized use.

Significance
A voice, or other distinctive uncopyrightable features, is deemed as part of someone's identity who is famous for that feature and is thus controllable against unauthorized use.  Impersonation of a voice, or similarly distinctive feature, must be granted permission by the original artist for a public impersonation, even for copyrighted materials.

References

External links

United States Court of Appeals for the Ninth Circuit cases
United States copyright case law
1988 in United States case law
Ford Motor Company
Bette Midler